The 2011 Gravesham Borough Council election took place on 5 May 2011 to elect members of Gravesham Borough Council in Kent, England. The whole council was up for election and the Labour Party gained overall control of the council from the Conservative Party.

Background
Before the election the Conservatives had run the council since the 2007 election when they won 26 seats, compared to 16 for Labour. However Labour gained a seat back at a by-election in June 2009 in Painters Ash ward.

During the campaign the national Labour leader Ed Miliband came to Gravesham twice, while the Conservative Prime Minister David Cameron met party activists, along with visits by other senior figures from the two parties. Apart from the Conservative and Labour parties there were also candidates from the United Kingdom Independence Party in 5 wards and the Liberal Democrats in 3 wards.

Election result
Labour gained 8 seats to take control of the council from the Conservatives. Labour made gains in Central, Painters Ash, Singlewell and Westcourt wards to hold 25 seats, compared to 19 for the Conservatives.

Following the election Ed Miliband came back to Gravesham and said "Our victory here is both a sign of our progress and a symbol of our task ahead." Both the local Conservative and Labour leaders on the council, Mike Snelling and John Burden, put the results down to the cuts being made by the national Conservative led government.

Ward results

References

2011 English local elections
2011
2010s in Kent